In algebraic geometry, a morphism  of schemes is said to be locally acyclic if, roughly, any sheaf on S and its restriction to X through f have the same étale cohomology, locally. For example, a smooth morphism is universally locally acyclic.

References 
.

Morphisms of schemes